The Legacy of the Blues Vol. 7 is an album by American blues pianist Memphis Slim which was recorded in 1967 and released on the Swedish Sonet label.

Reception

In his review for Allmusic, Nathan Bush says "Throughout the set, Slim is happy to lend the spotlight to his sidemen, working the 88s behind Eddie Chamblee's tenor solo on 'I Am the Blues' and Billy Butler's guitar on 'Ballin' the Jack.' Even in these situations however, the pianist is dazzling and his commentary always worth paying attention to."

Track listing 
All compositions by Peter Chapman
 "Everyday (I Have the Blues)" – 2:58    
 "I Am the Blues" – 2:49    
 "A Long Time Gone" – 2:35   
 "I Feel Like Ballin' the Jack" – 2:27   
 "Strange, Strange Feeling (Let's Get with It)" – 2:26   
 "Only Fools Have Fun" – 2:51    
 "Broadway Boogie" – 3:05    
 "Gambler's Blues" – 4:06   
 "Freedom" – 5:55     
 "Sassy Mae" – 2:39

Personnel 
Memphis Slim – vocals, piano
Billy Butler – guitar
Eddie Chamblee – tenor sax
Lloyd Trotman – bass
Herb Lavelle – drums

References 

1973 albums
Memphis Slim albums
Sonet Records albums